High Wide & Handsome: The Charlie Poole Project is the 20th studio album by American singer-songwriter Loudon Wainwright III. The album, a double-CD released on August 18, 2009, on 2nd Story Sound, pays tribute to singer and banjo picker Charlie Poole (1892–1931). It features 30 tracks, including new versions of songs made popular by Poole from 1925 through 1930, as well as original songs on Poole's turbulent life by Wainwright and producer Dick Connette.

More than 25 artists contributed to the album, including Wainwright's children, Rufus Wainwright, Martha Wainwright and Lucy Wainwright Roche, all singer-songwriters in their own right; his sister, singer-songwriter Sloan Wainwright; Maggie, Suzzy and Terre Roche of The Roches; Gabriel Kahane on piano; Chris Thile, mandolinist and vocalist; and Geoff Muldaur, a founding member of the 1960s group Jim Kweskin Jug Band.

The album won the 2010 Grammy Award for Best Traditional Folk Album.

Background
In the 70-page booklet that accompanies the album, Wainwright recalls having first heard of Poole in the early 1970s through folksinger Patrick Sky. He was at Sky's home in Rhode Island, and Sky played the Poole novelty song "Awful Hungry Hash House". Wainwright found it hilarious, and over the next few years learned other songs by the North Carolina picker. He also became intrigued by stories of Poole's life – his days as a mill worker, his stint as a semi-pro baseball player, his success as one of country music's first stars, and the alcoholism that led to his early death.

Wainwright admits to identifying with Poole, whom he describes as a "rambling, hard-drinking, crazy Southern showman." He initially thought of writing a biographical film on Poole's life and fantasized about playing the lead part, but it never came to anything. Instead, some three decades later, he and Connette collaborated in recording what Wainwright refers to as "a sonic bio-pic of sorts."

Connette conceived the idea for the album after giving Wainwright a copy of the three-CD collection Charlie Poole and the Roots of Country Music (Columbia, 2005). He also bought a copy for himself, and in listening to it, he says he thought about "how it was that Loudon particularly related to Poole – the humor, the clarity, the simplicity, the wise guy attitude, and, occasionally, an unapologetic emotional sincerity." In December 2007, he proposed recording songs that Poole had recorded, along with writing new songs on the artist's life and times. After the success of a demo Wainwright recorded "The Deal", a traditional song performed by Poole that was a huge hit in 1925 (it sold 100,000 copies at a time when there were only 600,000 phonograph players in existence), Connette says, "I knew we were onto something." Shortly afterwards, Wainwright wrote what was to become the album's title track, "High Wide & Handsome". With that, the project started to come together.

Besides wanting to pay tribute to Poole, Wainwright and Connette had another purpose in creating High Wide & Handsome. Despite his significant contributions to the development of country music – Poole had already had several hits before country greats Jimmie Rodgers and the Carter Family recorded their first songs in 1927 – he has yet to be named to the Country Music Hall of Fame. Wainwright and Connette hope their album will help win Poole induction into the Hall and earn him the recognition they believe he deserves. Taking this a step further, in early August 2009, just before High Wide & Handsome's release, Wainwright and two of the musicians featured on the album, David Mansfield and Chaim Tannenbaum, performed a set of material from the album in a concert at the Hall of Fame's Ford Theater.

Track list

Personnel

Loudon Wainwright III – banjo, guitar, vocals, backing vocals, liner notes, photo courtesy
Paul Asaro – piano
C.J. Camerieri – trumpet, French horn, brass arrangement
Dick Connette – arranger, cymbals, drums (bass), backing vocals, producer, liner notes, vocal arrangement, song notes
Paula Court – photography
Michael Davis – trombone
Peter Ecklund – trumpet, whistle (human)
Danielle Farina – viola
Erik Friedlander – cello
Rayna Gellert – violin
Scott Hull – mastering
Milt Kramer – photography
Scott Lehrer – engineer, mixing
Stewart Lerman – engineer
Dan "D Unit" Levine – trombone, euphonium
Tim Luntzel – bass
Dana Lyn – violin
David Mansfield – bass, dobro, mandolin, violin, backing vocals, string arrangements
Greil Marcus – liner notes

Rob Moose – acoustic guitar, mandolin, violin, arranger, national steel guitar, tenor guitar
Geoff Muldaur – banjo, arranger
Matt Munisteri – banjo, guitar, arranger
Ben Perowsky – drums
Dave Roche – backing vocals
Maggie Roche – vocals, backing vocals
Suzzy Roche – backing vocals
Terre Roche – backing vocals, vocal arrangement
Marcus Rojas – tuba
Kinney Rorrer – liner notes, photo courtesy
Stefan Schatz – drums
Johnny Lee Schell – engineer
Wade Schuman – harmonica
Chaim Tannenbaum – banjo, guitar, harmonica, mandolin, vocals, backing vocals
Chris Thile – mandolin, backing vocals
Alex Venguer – engineer, mixing
Martha Wainwright – backing vocals
Rufus Wainwright – backing vocals
Sloan Wainwright – backing vocals
Paul Woodiel – violin

References

External links
You Ain't Talking To Me: Charlie Poole and the Roots of Country Music
List of Charlie Poole songs

2009 albums
Loudon Wainwright III albums